Moussa Ouattara may refer to:

Moussa Ouattara (born 1988), Burkinabé basketball player
Moussa Ouattara (born 1981), Burkinabé footballer